Tight Shoes is the ninth studio album by the classic rock band Foghat. It was released in 1980 on Bearsville Records. This was also the last release Rod Price participated on until 1994's Return of the Boogie Men.

Track listing
All tracks by Dave Peverett.
"Stranger in My Home Town" – 4:24
"Loose Ends" – 4:38
"Full Time Lover" – 4:30
"Baby I Can Change Your Mind" – 4:56
"Too Late the Hero" – 5:01
"Dead End Street" – 5:00
"Be My Woman" – 5:57
"No Hard Feelings" – 6:15

Personnel
Dave Peverett - rhythm guitar, vocals
Rod Price - lead guitar, slide guitar
Craig MacGregor - bass guitar
Roger Earl - drums

Charts

References

Foghat albums
1980 albums
Bearsville Records albums
Rhino Records albums